The 1937–38 Allsvenskan was the fourth season of the top division of Swedish handball. Eight teams competed in the league. Majornas IK won the league, but the title of Swedish Champions was awarded to the winner of Svenska mästerskapet. Sanna IF and Göteborgs IK were relegated.

League table

Attendance

References 

Swedish handball competitions